Tomás Bilbao Hospitalet (1890–1954) was a Basque-origin Spanish architect and politician. He was among the founders of Basque Nationalist Action. After serving as a minister of justice he exiled first to France and then, to Mexico.

Early life and education

Bilbao was born in Bilbao on 18 September 1890 and his father was a building contractor. He received a degree in architecture in 1918 from the School of Architecture of Madrid.

Career
After working as an architecture Bilbao designed Altos Hornos de Vizcaya in 1929. Like other architects of his generation he was influenced from German expressionism and the architectural approach led by Erich Mendelsohn. Bilbao involved in politics and became a cofounder of the Basque Nationalist Action party in 1930 and the president of the Bilbao Municipal Housing Board in 1931. He was also councillor and deputy mayor of the Bilbao City Council during the Second Republic. In the period 1937–1938 he was minister of justice.

Exile, personal life and death
Bilbao first exiled to France. Then he settled in Mexico in May 1942 when France was invaded by Nazi forces. There he worked for the Compañía Mexicana de Comercio Exterior. 

Bilbao was married to Julia Durán with whom he had seven children. Their oldest son was arrested and executed following the exile of his father. Tomás Bilbao died in Mexico City on 16 March 1954.

One of his grandchildren, Tatiana Bilbao, is a well-known architecture in Mexico.

References

External links

20th-century Spanish architects
1890 births
1954 deaths
Justice ministers of Spain
Basque Nationalist Action politicians
Politicians from Bilbao
Exiled Spanish politicians
Exiles of the Spanish Civil War in France
Exiles of the Spanish Civil War in Mexico
Expressionist architects